Finley Rasmussen is a New Zealand rugby league player who was named in Wellington Rugby League's team of the century in 2012.

Playing career
Rasmussen played for the Randwick Kingfishers club in the Wellington Rugby League, making his senior debut in 1963. That same year he made his debut for Wellington.

A goalkicker, Rasmussen won Wellington's Stacey Shield for most points in a season three consecutive times, in 1969, 1970 and 1971.

He retired from representative football in 1975 after 68 matches for Wellington, only the second player to reach 50 matches after Colin O'Neil. He retired as a player in 1979, having won premierships with Randwick in 1969, 1969, 1970 and 1976. His seventeen seasons for Randwick is a Wellington club record that still stands.

Coaching career
Rasmussen coached Randwick between 1982 and 1985. The club won the Wellington premiership in 1983, 1984 and 1985 and made all four National club grand finals during his time in charge.

Personal life
Of Cook Islands descent, Rasmussen played rugby league alongside his four brothers. All five played for Randwick and three of them, including Rasmussen, played for Wellington.

References

New Zealand rugby league players
New Zealand rugby league coaches
New Zealand sportspeople of Cook Island descent
New Zealand people of Danish descent
Wellington rugby league team players
Randwick Kingfishers players
Rugby league halfbacks
Year of birth missing (living people)
Living people